Institute of Philology of the Siberian Branch of the RAS is a research institute based in Akademgorodok of Novosibirsk, Russia.

History
In 1966, the Institute of History, Philology, and Philosophy was created in Novosibirsk.

Institute of Philology was founded in 1990 as part of the United Institute of History, Philology and Philosophy of the Siberian Branch of the Academy of Sciences of the USSR.

In 2006, the institute became an independent organization of the SB RAS

References

External links
  
  

Research institutes in Novosibirsk
Linguistic research institutes
Research institutes in the Soviet Union